Susan Lark is a medical doctor. She obtained her education from Northwestern Medical School, and has served as one of the clinical faculty members at  Stanford University. At Stanford, Lark taught In the department of family and community medicine. As of now Lark works in the field of women’s health and preventive medicine. Lark is the founder and director of the Menopause Self Help Center located in Los Altos, California.  She is well known for her innovative approaches to menopause and hormone management as well as her views on holistic women’s health.  Her holistic approaches focus on hormone balance to assist in the prevention of different physical and emotional health conditions. She believes that maintaining a slightly alkaline body pH will ultimately lead to optimal health especially in the prevention of diseases such as, osteoporosis. Dr. Susan Lark has currently innovated and developed different types of nutritional supplements and all natural products in the field of women’s health and hormonal balance.  Her products were invented to allow women to achieve hormone balance without having to utilize conventional hormone replacement therapies.  According to Healthy Directions, “she is also a distinguished clinician, lecturer, and author of 13 best-selling books on women’s health, including Chemistry of Success and the cookbook Eat Papayas Naked, as well as a series of self-help books on women’s health topics like hot flashes, PMS, anxiety, and chronic fatigue. Her most recent book is Hormone Revolution, written with Kimberly S. Day. She has also been featured in many publications, including Real Simple, Reader’s Digest, Better Homes & Gardens, New Woman, Family Circle, Shape, The New York Times, and The San Francisco Chronicle.

References

Living people
Year of birth missing (living people)